Neoeromene parvipuncta is a moth in the family Crambidae. It was described by David E. Gaskin in 1986. It is found in Paraná, Brazil.

References

Diptychophorini
Moths described in 1986